The following is a list of players, both past and current, who appeared at least in one game for the Taichung Suns (2022–present) or Taichung Wagor Suns (2021–2022) franchise.



Players

B

C

D

G

H

J

K

L

M

P

R

S

T

W

Y

References

T1 League all-time rosters